Abagrotis alampeta is a moth of the family Noctuidae. It is found in North America, including Arizona, New Mexico, California and Mexico.

The wingspan is about 33 mm.

External links
Images

alampeta
Moths of North America
Moths described in 1967